John Stuart Wilson (born 5 April 1944) is a British mathematician and former professor of mathematics at the University of Oxford. He is a Fellow of Christ's College, Cambridge and an Honorary Professor of the University of Leipzig. He specialises in algebra and group theory.  
He also composes music for choirs and for vocal and instrumental ensembles.

Education
John Wilson was educated at Christ's College, Cambridge.  After gaining the BA degree in 1966 he obtained the PhD degree in 1971 with a dissertation entitled Subgroups of finite index in infinite groups.  He was awarded the degree of ScD in 1989.

Research
John Wilson has worked on many aspects of group theory.  His best known contributions are to the study of just infinite groups and branch groups, to profinite group theory, to generation results for finite simple groups, and solubility criteria for finite groups

Mathematical career
John Wilson was elected a Fellow of Christ's College, Cambridge in 1969, and subsequently became a Lecturer in Mathematics in the Department of Pure Mathematics and Mathematical Statistics. In 1993 he was appointed to the Mason Chair of Mathematics at the University of Birmingham, and in 2003 became professor of mathematics at the University of Oxford.
On retirement from Oxford in 2011 he returned to Cambridge.  He held the Leibniz Professorship at the University of Leipzig during the winter semester 2014–15 and in 2017 became an honorary professor of the University of Leipzig. He served as editor-in-chief of the Journal of Group Theory from its foundation for 20 years.

Music
John Wilson received the Licentiate of the Royal Academy of Music (LRAM) in 1963 and had some composition lessons with Luciano Berio.  He has been involved with choral singing since his childhood and has sung under the batons of distinguished conductors including Benjamin Britten.  
His compositions for choir include psalm and canticle settings, settings of texts by John Milton and Martin Luther, and part songs. He has also written Lieder with texts by Shakespeare, Brentano, Mongré  and other poets, and music for various combinations of instruments.

References 

Academics of the University of Oxford
1944 births
Living people
Alumni of Christ's College, Cambridge
Fellows of Christ's College, Cambridge
Academics of the University of Birmingham
Academic journal editors
20th-century British composers
21st-century British mathematicians
21st-century British composers
Group theorists